Strandiata abyssinica is a species of beetle in the family Cerambycidae. It was described by Stephan von Breuning in 1935, originally under the genus Tricholamia. It is known from Ethiopia.

References

Endemic fauna of Ethiopia
Phrissomini
Beetles described in 1935